Reginald Alfred Keeling  (15 January 1904 – 7 August 1991) was a New Zealand politician of the Labour Party.

Biography

Early life and career
Keeling was born in 1904 in Fulham to Alfred J. Keeling. He was educated at Fulham Central School. Upon leaving school he joined Maypole Margarine Works as a cadet in the accounting department. After obtaining his articles he emigrated to New Zealand in 1928 to join Waitemata Electric Power Board as accountant. In 1932 he was appointed manager of Morris Hedstrom Tonga. He was a social activist and an active member of the Labor Party in both England and New Zealand upon returning to New Zealand in 1936, he moved from accounting to social work with the newly formed Child Welfare Division of the Education Department.

He was promoted to District Child Welfare Officer for the East Coast based in Gisborne. He remained in that post until entering Parliament in 1949. An avid sportsman, he was a football referee for twenty years, played senior club tennis well into his thirties and was a keen keel boat sailor. He was President of Poverty Bay Football Association 1940-61, President NZFA 1960-61, President of Auckland Football Association 1961-87.

Local politics
From that point he made a career well into his eighties out of both national and local body politics. He was Deputy Mayor of Gisborne 1953-59, Member of Cook Hospital Board 1953-61, Member Waitemata Electric Power Board 1965-87, Mayor of Henderson 1965-74, Member Auckland Regional Authority 1965-81, Deputy Mayor of Waitemata City 1977-80. In the 1980 New Year Honours, Keeling was appointed a Companion of the Queen's Service Order for public services.

Member of Parliament

Keeling was Chairman of Committees during the Second Labour Government (1957–60). The Labour government held a working majority of one meaning the management of business in the house became vital to avoid the government losing an important vote. Keeling was praised for his skills in conducting committee business, especially for his quick rulings which were both firm and stuck, setting good precedence.

He stood for North Shore in the 1963 general election but was defeated.

Death
Keeling died on 7 August 1991, aged 87.

Notes

References

Richard Keeling's obituary

|-

|-

1904 births
1991 deaths
Deputy mayors of places in New Zealand
New Zealand Labour Party MPs
Unsuccessful candidates in the 1963 New Zealand general election
Unsuccessful candidates in the 1960 New Zealand general election
Unsuccessful candidates in the 1951 New Zealand general election
Members of the New Zealand House of Representatives
New Zealand MPs for Auckland electorates
New Zealand MPs for North Island electorates
Companions of the Queen's Service Order
Auckland regional councillors
Members of district health boards in New Zealand